Open 3D Engine is a free and open-source 3D game engine developed by Open 3D Foundation, a subsidiary of the Linux Foundation, and distributed under the Apache 2.0 open source license. The initial version of the engine is an updated version of Amazon Lumberyard, contributed by Amazon Games. As of July 7, 2021, a developer preview of the engine is available.

Partners 
Partners were recruited on the basis of resources, expertise, and motivation to foster a self-sustaining open source community for O3DE. These partners include: Accelbyte, Adobe, Apocalypse Studios, Audiokinetic, Backtrace.io, Carbonated, Futurewei, GAMEPOCH, Genvid Technologies, Hadean, Huawei, HERE Technologies, Intel, International Game Developers Association, Kythera AI, Niantic, Open Robotics, PopcornFX, Red Hat, Rochester Institute of Technology, SideFX, Tafi, TLM Partners, and Wargaming.

Premier members are Adobe, AWS, Epic Games, Huawei, Intel, Microsoft, Niantic and Tencent (with the LightSpeed Studios brand).

See also

 Amazon Lumberyard
 CryEngine

References

External links 

O3D Foundation Website
Linux Foundation to Form New Open 3D Foundation

2021 software
3D graphics software
Cross-platform software
Free game engines
IPhone video game engines
Software that uses Qt
Software using the Apache license
Software using the MIT license
Video game engines
Game engines for Linux